MC Lon, stage name of Airon de Lima, is a singer-songwriter. He came to fame after the release of the song "Novinha, Vem que Tem", that has over 30 million hits on YouTube and is now one of the leading names in funk ostentação.

After the success MC Lon had his first contact with television stations. Before the MC Lon's success he earned about 3.00 dollars per haircut, and now with their invoice shows an average of 400 thousand dollars a month. Lon grew up without his father, who after winning his fame went to his father and found him. In the award ceremony YouTube Music Awards in 2013, MC Lon introduced in Marina da Glória in Rio de Janeiro, with Eminem as winner of the award.

Discography

Singles
 Visão da Sobrevivência part. 2
 Novinha, Vem que Tem Brasileiro que Nunca Desiste O Tempo não Espera (part. MC Guimê) Talento Raro A Festa''
 Cabelo Arrepiado
 Se joga (part. MC melqui)

References 

Funk carioca musicians
Brazilian hip hop musicians
Brazilian rappers
1991 births
Living people